Steinar Bråten (born 17 September 1962) is a Norwegian former ski jumper.

Career
He had 27 participations in the World Cup between 1982 and 1988 with four podium positions and one victory, the latter in Holmenkollen in 1983. His only Olympic participation was in the 1984 Winter Olympics.

After his active career Bråten has worked as a coach for the national ski jumping team and is currently working at the Norwegian University of Science and Technology and Olympiatoppen where he conducts research related to technical jumping.

World Cup

Standings

Wins

References

External links

1962 births
Living people
People from Drangedal
Olympic ski jumpers of Norway
Ski jumpers at the 1984 Winter Olympics
Norwegian ski jumping coaches
Sportspeople from Vestfold og Telemark
20th-century Norwegian people